UCOCAR (Unidad Naval Coordinadora de los Servicios de Carenado, Reparaciones de Casco, Reparaciones y Mantenimiento de Equipos de y Sistemas Buques) is a state-owned shipyard in Venezuela, which is responsible for the repair, maintenance, construction of ships and equipment, systems, hull, structures related to ships up to 8,000 tons, in support of the National Bolivarian Armed Forces of Venezuela, Public and Private Organizations. The company is mainly built ships for Bolivarian Navy of Venezuela.

References

External links
 

Shipbuilding companies of Venezuela
Defence companies of Venezuela
Manufacturing companies of Venezuela
Government-owned companies of Venezuela
Manufacturing companies established in 1990
1990 establishments in Venezuela